Emperor John may refer to:

Roman and Byzantine emperors
Joannes (died 425), augustus of the Western Roman Empire, 423-425

Byzantine emperors 
John I Tzimiskes, (circa 925–976), Byzantine Emperor from 969 to 976
John II Komnenos, Byzantine emperor
John III Doukas Vatatzes, Byzantine emperor
John IV Laskaris, Byzantine emperor
John V Palaiologos, Byzantine emperor
John VI Kantakouzenos, Byzantine emperor
John VII Palaiologos, Byzantine emperor
John VIII Palaiologos, Byzantine emperor

Latin emperors
 John of Brienne, Latin Emperor of Constantinople

Emperors at Trebizond
 John I of Trebizond, Emperor of Trebizond from 1235 to 1238
 John II of Trebizond (c. 1262–August 16, 1297), Emperor of Trebizond from 1280 to 1297
 John III of Trebizond (c. 1321–1362), Emperor of Trebizond
 John IV of Trebizond (c. 1403–1459), Emperor of Trebizond from 1429 to 1459

Ethiopian emperors
 Yohannes I of Ethiopia, Emperor of Ethiopia
 Yohannes II of Ethiopia, Emperor of Ethiopia
 Yohannes III of Ethiopia, Emperor of Ethiopia
 Yohannes IV of Ethiopia, Emperor of Ethiopia

Russian emperors
 Ivan I of Russia, Ivan Danilovich Kalita; numbered with Tsars of Russia but not an emperor
 Ivan II of Russia, Ivan Ivanovich; numbered with Tsars of Russia but not an emperor
 Ivan III of Russia, Ivan Vasilevich; numbered with Tsars of Russia but not an emperor
 Ivan IV of Russia, Ivan Vasilevich, Ivan the Terrible, Tsar of Russia
 Ivan V of Russia, Ivan Alekseievich, Tsar of Russia
 Ivan VI of Russia, Ivan Antonovich, Emperor of Russia

Bulgarian emperors
 Ivan Vladislav of Bulgaria, Emperor of Bulgaria
 Ivan Asen I, Emperor of Bulgaria
 Ivan Asen II, Emperor of Bulgaria
 Ivan Asen III, Emperor of Bulgaria
 Ivan Stephen of Bulgaria, Emperor of Bulgaria
 Ivan Alexander of Bulgaria, Emperor of Bulgaria
 Ivan Shishman of Bulgaria, Emperor of Bulgaria
 Ivan Sratsimir of Bulgaria, Emperor of Bulgaria